"Hey" is a cover song by American singer Mitchel Musso, originally sung by Gillmor, and second single from his debut album, Mitchel Musso. The song premiered on Radio Disney on May 15, 2009. A music video for the song premiered on Disney Channel the same day, May 15.  It is also the singer's most successful song on both the Canadian and American charts.

Release
The song was originally recorded by Ryan Gilmor as the theme song of the short-lived Farrelly brothers sitcom Unhitched. "Hey" premiered on Radio Disney on May 15, 2009 and reached No. 3 on the Top 30 Countdown. It is his second single from his self-titled album. It is also one of his best known songs.

Music video

Musso filmed a music video for the song in April 2009. The video was released on Disney Channel on the same day as the song's release, May 15, 2009.  The video consists of Musso walking up a street over and over, as to "reliving" the day with many special effects used. He then goes into a performance sequence where he performs the rest of the song on the street with his band.

Charts

References

2009 singles
Mitchel Musso songs
2009 songs
Walt Disney Records singles
Songs written by Tim Pagnotta